Micrelenchus huttonii is a species of sea snail, a marine gastropod mollusk in the family Trochidae, the top snails.

Description
The shell grows to a length of 14½ mm, its diameter 10½ mm. The covered perforate shell has a short-conical shape. It is bluish-black or purplishblack, the apex worn white. The 5 to 6 whorls are slightly convex. Their sculpture contains 7 to 8 spiral striae and incremental lines. The body whorl is obtusely angular at the periphery, rather convex beneath, slightly impressed in the region of the umbilicus. The lightly grooved aperture is subcircular-quadrate and iridescent within. The lip is within a trifle thickened. It is whitish and narrowly edged with black. The  thickened columella is  slightly arcuate and covers the perforation.

Distribution
This marine species occurs off New Zealand.

References

 Smith, E.A. (1876) A list of marine shells, chiefly from the Solomon Islands, with descriptions of several new species. Journal of the Linnean Society of London, 12, 535–562, pl. 30
 Marshall B.A. 1998. The New Zealand Recent species of Cantharidus Montfort, 1810 and Micrelenchus Finlay, 1926 (Mollusca: Gastropoda: Trochidae). Molluscan Research 19(1): 107-156 
 Spencer, H.G., Marshall, B.A. & Willan, R.C. (2009). Checklist of New Zealand living Mollusca. pp 196–219. in: Gordon, D.P. (ed.) New Zealand inventory of biodiversity. Volume one. Kingdom Animalia: Radiata, Lophotrochozoa, Deuterostomia. Canterbury University Press, Christchurch

External links
 To World Register of Marine Species
 
 Hutton F.W. (1878). Révision des coquilles de la Nouvelle-Zélande et des Iles Chatham. Journal de Conchyliologie. 26: 5-57

huttonii
Gastropods described in 1876